The Territorial Defense Forces was an armed force responsible for the internal security of Poland and separate from the Polish Army. The OTK existed from 1965 until 2008. As initially organized, OTK forces included both an "Internal Defense Army" and the "Border Defense Force". This style of internal security organization corresponded to that used by the Soviet Union during the same period. 

After the fall of communism in Poland, changing political priorities led to the reduction of OTK forces. By 1 July 2008, the last of its battalions were converted to mechanized units of the army.

History
The OTK was founded in 1965 to help defend Polish territory in situations where the Polish People's Army was engaged abroad under Warsaw Pact obligations. Although their primary mission was defending the homeland, the OTK also had the Warsaw Pact mission of transporting Soviet forces and supplies across Poland in wartime. Formed mainly from units shifted from the Ministry of Internal Affairs, the OTK went under a new Inspectorate for National Territorial Defense in the Ministry of National Defense. The OTK included the Internal Defense Forces (the largest unit) and several smaller territorial defense units. Immediately after World War II, the WOW's predecessor organization, the Internal Security Corps had suppressed the Home Army, which had been loyal to the London government-in-exile; the KBW had also played a large part in suppressing the Poznan workers in 1956.

The WOW, which totaled 65,000 troops in 1982, were equipped as mechanized infantry units, including tanks. The component units, which were organized at district level, had the missions of engaging hostile troops on Polish territory and eliminating local underground elements. The units were to receive the same individual training as regular ground forces, although they did not participate in large-scale coordinated exercises.

By 1990 the WOW was not a credible military force. The organization included many nonmilitary patriotic and social groups, such as the boy scouts, and many military retirees found soft assignments in OTK units. Although the force had a military commander, it was not under the direct control of the Ministry of National Defense. By 1991 budget cuts were reducing personnel significantly, and plans called for transforming many OTK units into civil defense formations that would support production and service in the civilian economy. The OTK units remaining armed and attached to districts as regional defense forces would count as part of the ground forces' planned mid-1990s allotment of about 150,000 troops. They were to function as cadre units reinforcing operational ground forces within their territorial boundaries. Reduction of OTK units continued, and the last units of the OTK were converted to mechanized infantry units of the Polish Army by 1 July 2008.

The change resulted in personnel reductions from 21,000 in 1991 to 13,500. 

On November 16, 2016, the Seym of the Republic of Poland passed the act establishing Territorial Defence Forces from January 1, 2017.

References

Sources 
: Glenn E. Curtis (ed.), Poland : a country study, p. 267, Washington: GPO, 1994. .

 

Defunct gendarmeries
Military units and formations of Poland
Military units and formations established in 1965
Military units and formations disestablished in 2008

Wojska obrony terytorialnej WOT